The 2019 Czech Mixed Doubles Curling Championship was held in Prague from February 1 to 3, 2019.

Six teams took part in the championship, with the top three teams promoted to the playoffs which involved a best of three semifinal and final.

The winners of the championship were team "Zbraslav H" (Zuzana Paulová / Tomáš Paul), who beat team "Savona 1" (Petra Vinšová / Lukáš Klíma) in the final. The bronze medal was won by team "Savona M" (Eva Miklíková / Dalibor Miklík).

The championship team represented the Czech Republic at the 2019 World Mixed Doubles Curling Championship, where they finished fifth.

Teams

Round Robin

Playoffs

Semifinal
February 2, 17:00 UTC+1

Final 1
February 3, 9:00 UTC+1

Final 2
February 3, 13:00 UTC+1

Final standings

References

See also
2019 Czech Women's Curling Championship

Czech Mixed Doubles Curling Championship
Czech Mixed Doubles Curling Championship
Curling Mixed Doubles Championship
Czech Mixed Doubles Curling Championship
Sports competitions in Prague